In the 1950s and 1960s "a third vinyl format" was introduced alongside long-playing (LP) albums, and singles. The extended play (EP) used the same formats as singles but contained more tracks. Singles were the popular record format at the time – predominantly 10-inch 78 rpm and 7-inch 45 rpm formats – and the first singles chart was published by New Musical Express in 1952 with many other publications also producing singles charts in the 1950s and 1960s. Record Mirror published the first album chart in 1956 and, when Record Retailer began compiling an LP chart on 12 March 1960, they also compiled an EP chart. The EP chart consisted of a top ten and was expanded to fifteen positions the following week, and twenty the week after that. EPs "died out in the late 1960s" and Record Retailer reduced the chart to ten positions on 16 April 1966, publishing the final EP chart on 16 December 1967. For six weeks in 1966 and two weeks in December 1967, Record Retailer did not publish EP charts but they were compiled and Record Mirror published them; Record Mirror had begun publishing charts compiled by Record Retailer in March 1962, following a decision to stop compiling their own albums and singles charts.

The longest consecutive duration at the top of the chart was 23 weeks for The Shadows' EP The Shadows to the Fore. The most weeks at number one was achieved by The Beach Boys EP Hits which spent 34 weeks there from June 1966 and was the incumbent number one when the chart ceased at the end of 1967. The Beatles had eight different EPs top the chart as did The Shadows (four with Cliff Richard and four on their own). The Shadows spent 69 weeks with an EP on top of the chart in comparison to The Beatles' 63 weeks. Conversely, only four acts spent a total of one week atop the chart; Joan Baez, Jim Reeves, George Mitchell Minstrels and Bobby Vee (with The Crickets). Although official music recording sales certifications were not introduced until the British Phonographic Industry was formed in 1973, Disc introduced an initiative in 1959 to present a gold disc to records that sold over one million units and a silver disc to records selling over 250,000 units. Seven EPs are recorded as going silver: The Beatles' number-one EPs Twist and Shout, The Beatles' Hits, All My Loving, Long Tall Sally as well as The Beatles (No. 1) and Magical Mystery Tour (which did not reach number one but would have done so had the EP chart lasted only a few more weeks) and The Rolling Stones' number-one EP Five by Five.

Number-one EPs

By artist
The following artists achieved two or more number-one EPs. Artists The Beatles and The Shadows were the most successful acts of the decade in terms of number-one EPs, each having eight EPs reach the top of the chart. In total, The Shadows spent 69 weeks occupying the top of chart (59 weeks from 4 EPs as an instrumental group and 10 weeks from 4 EPs accompanying Cliff Richard) and The Beatles spent a total of 63 weeks at number one.

Notes

References
Footnotes

Sources

EPs
EPs